The Central Military Commission (CMC) is the highest national defense organization in the People's Republic of China, which heads the People's Liberation Army (PLA), the People's Armed Police (PAP), and the Militia of China.

It operates within the Chinese Communist Party (CCP) under the name "Central Military Commission of the Communist Party of China", and as the military branch of the central government under the name "Central Military Commission of the People's Republic of China". Under the arrangement of "one institution with two names", both commissions have identical personnel, organization and function, and operate under both the party and state systems. The commission's parallel hierarchy allows the CCP to supervise the political and military activities of the PLA, including issuing directives on senior appointments, troop deployments and arms spending.

The CMC is chaired by Xi Jinping, the General Secretary of the Chinese Communist Party and paramount leader. Almost all the members are senior generals, but the most important posts have always been held by the party's most senior leaders to ensure the loyalty of the armed forces. CMC has control over 6.8 million personnel. The CMC is housed in the Ministry of National Defense compound ("August 1st or 'Eight-One' Building") in western Beijing.

History 

The party military committee dates back to October 1925, and while operating under various degrees of authority and responsibility, was consistently named the CCP Central Military Commission. Among Western commentators, “Affairs” is frequently dropped from the title. As a commission, it ranks higher in the party hierarchy than departments such as the Organization or United Front Departments. In 1937 the CCP Central Revolutionary Military Commission was created after the Chinese Soviet Republic's Chinese Red Army were integrated into the Kuomintang's army for the anti-Japanese war, and it later evolved into the Central Military Commission after the Party's 7th Congress in 1945. In this period, the committee was always chaired by Mao Zedong.

In the September 1949 reorganization, military leadership was transferred to a government body, the People's Revolutionary Military Commission of the Central People's Government. The final coexistence of two military committees was set in 1954, as the CCP Central Military Commission was re-established, while state military authority rested into a National Defense Council of the People's Republic of China chaired by the President in keeping with the 1954 Constitution.

As Mao Zedong was also the Chairman of the Chinese Communist Party and led military affairs as a whole, the CMC and NDC's day-to-day work was carried out by its first-ranking vice-chairman, a post which was occupied by Lin Biao until his death in 1971, then by Ye Jianying. As a consequence of the Cultural Revolution, the Party CMC became the sole military overseeing body, and the National Defence Council was abolished in 1975.

Deng Xiaoping's efforts to institutionally separate the CCP and the state led to the establishment of today’s State CMC, which was created in 1982 by the Constitution of China in order to formalize the role of the military within the government structure. Both the National Defense Commission and State CMC have been described as 'consultative' bodies. Contrarily to the National Defense Commission, however, the Party and state CMCs are almost identical in leadership, composition, and powers.

The Commission included the post of secretary-general until 1992. This post was held by Yang Shangkun (1945–1954), Huang Kecheng (1954–1959), Luo Ruiqing (1959–1966), Ye Jianying (1966–1977), Luo Ruiqing (1977–1979), Geng Biao (1979–1981), Yang Shangkun (1981–1989), Yang Baibing (1989–1992).

In 2016, the 4 traditional general departments were dissolved by order of Chairman Xi Jinping, and in their place 15 new departments were created as part of the ongoing modernization of the PLA.

Command structure 
Unlike in most countries, the Central Military Commission is not organizational equivalent of other government ministries. Although China does have a Ministry of National Defense, headed by a Minister of National Defense, it exists solely for liaison with foreign militaries and does not have command authority.

The most important chain of command runs from the CMC to the 15 general departments (Joint Staff Department,  Political Work Department,  Logistic Support Department, Equipments Development Department) and, in turn, to each of the service branches (ground, navy and air forces). In addition, the CMC also has direct control over the Rocket Forces, Strategic Support Forces, the National Defense University, and the Academy of Military Sciences. As stipulated in the 1997 National Defense Law, the CMC also controls the paramilitary People’s Armed Police (PAP), who have the politically sensitive role of guarding key government buildings (including the main leadership compound of Zhongnanhai in Beijing), armed offender response, emergency response and disaster relief work around China. China Coast Guard (CCG) and the Militia force are also under the control of the CMC. The CMC shared command authority over the PAP with the State Council mostly via the Ministry of Public Security; from 2018 the PAP is under the sole control of the CMC.

Although in theory the CMC has the highest military command authority, in reality the ultimate decision-making power concerning war, armed forces, and national defense resides with the Politburo of the CCP. The CMC is usually chaired by the General Secretary of the CCP, who is supported by two to three vice-chairmen, sometimes, but not currently, including the Defense Minister. Members of the CMC used to include the heads of the PLA’s four general departments and the Commanders of the Ground Force, Air Force, Navy and Rocket Force; but after the recent reform only Minister of National Defense, Chief of Joint Staff, Director of Political Work, and Secretary of Discipline Inspection are included.

Political structure 
The armed forces of China also have Joint Staff Department, the Political Work Department, the Logistics Support Department and the Equipment Development Department, which implements the directives of the Central Military Commission. Along with the General Secretary of the Communist Party and Premier of the State Council, the Chairman of the Central Military Commission have consistently been one of the most powerful political leaders in China.

The Chairman of the CMC was twice in its history held by a senior official who had given up his other posts: by Deng in the late 1980s, and by Jiang in the early 2000s. In the case of Deng Xiaoping, because of his prestige, he was able to exercise considerable power after his retirement, in part due to his holding the position of CMC Chairman. There was speculation that Jiang Zemin would have been able to retain similar authority after his retirement from the positions of General Secretary and President, but ultimately Jiang was unable to do so. One major factor is that, in contrast to Deng Xiaoping, who always had close relations with the People's Liberation Army, Jiang had no military background. In addition, with the promotion of the fourth generation of Chinese leaders to lead the civilian party, there was also a corresponding promotion of military leaders. All the military members of the CMC come from Hu Jintao's generation rather than from Jiang's, and at the time of the leadership transition, there appeared some very sharp editorials from military officers suggesting that the military would have strong objections to Jiang attempting to exercise power behind the scenes.

Jiang Zemin relinquished his post as chairman of the party's Central Military Commission in September 2004 to Hu Jintao, and from the state commission in March 2005, which appeared to solidify Hu's position as paramount leader. However, Jiang had appointed two generals who maintained good relations with him, Xu Caihou, and Guo Boxiong, to the vice-chairman positions, and continued to wield influence through them at the expense of Hu. Unlike Deng and Jiang, Hu relinquished his CMC post along with his remaining leadership offices in favour of his successor Xi Jinping.

In China's state-party-military tripartite political system, the CMC itself is a decision-making body whose day-to-day affairs are not nearly as transparent as that of the Central Committee or the State Council. As one of China's three main decision-making bodies the relative influence of the CMC can vary depending on the time period and the leaders. In the event of war or political crisis, for example, the CMC may well function as a de facto executive for the country's daily affairs.

The Tiananmen Protests of 1989 illustrates how the Central Military Commission functions. CMC Chairman Deng Xiaoping proposed the imposition martial law and the use of armed soldiers to suppress unarmed demonstrations in Beijing.

The Library of Congress says of the two CMCs: "The state Central Military Commission was the state's decision-making body in military affairs and directed and commanded the armed forces. The state Central Military Commission consisted of the chairman, who was commander in chief of the armed forces, an executive vice chairman, two vice chairmen, and four other members. Because the PLA has been under party control since its inception, the leadership of the party over the military did not change with the establishment of the state Central Military Commission. Although parallel leadership blurred the distinction between the two groups, the party Central Military Commission retained its traditional, preeminent position in charge of military affairs."

Election of members 
Theoretically, the CCP (Party) CMC is elected by the Central Committee of the Chinese Communist Party and is subordinate to the CCP Politburo and the Politburo Standing Committee (PBSC). In practice, membership is very closely controlled by the PBSC.

Similarly, the State CMC is nominally elected by the National People's Congress and theoretically reports to the Congress, but is in practice indistinguishable from the CCP CMC. This difference in elections also results in the only difference in membership between the two bodies, as party organs, such as the party congress and the Central Committee assemble at different times than the National People's Congress. For example, some were elected into the party CMC in the Sixteenth National Congress of the Chinese Communist Party in November 2002, but they entered the State CMC in March 2003, when the 10th National People's Congress convened.

The members are generally uniformed military commanders, except for the chairman and first vice-chairman, who have both been drawn from the Politburo in recent years. The military members are generally members of neither the Politburo Standing Committee nor the State Council outside of the Minister of National Defense, although they all tend to be members of the Communist Party and are members of the Central Committee. The military members are apparently chosen with regular promotion procedures from within the PLA.

Members 
The make-up of the current Central Military Commission of the Communist Party was determined at the 20th Party Congress held in October 2022; the state commission was confirmed at the 2023 National People's Congress.

 CMC Chairman
  Xi Jinping, also General Secretary of the Chinese Communist Party, President of the People's Republic of China

 CMC Vice Chairmen (2)
  General Zhang Youxia, member of the 19th Politburo and the 20th Politburo
  General He Weidong, member of the 20th Politburo

 CMC Members (4)
  General Li Shangfu, State Councilor and Minister of National Defense
  General Liu Zhenli, Chief of Staff of the Joint Staff Department
  Admiral Miao Hua, Director of the Political Work Department
  General Zhang Shengmin Secretary of the Commission for Discipline Inspection

Organization 
The exact internal organisation of the CMC is highly secretive. However, until 2015 it is known that the CMC contained least five key departments. The Joint Staff Department is the nerve center of the entire Chinese military command and control system, responsible for daily administrative duties of the CMC. The General Office processes all CMC communications and documents, coordinate meetings, and convey orders and directives to other subordinate organs.

During the 2015 military reform, by order of Chairman Xi Jinping, 15 departments were created to replace the 5 organs, which were disbanded. The new 15 departments are:
 General Office
 Joint Staff Department
 Political Work Department
 Logistic Support Department
 Equipment Development Department
 Training and Administration Department
 National Defense Mobilization Department
 Discipline Inspection Commission
 Politics and Legal Affairs Commission
 Science and Technology Commission
 Office for Strategic Planning
 Office for Reform and Organizational Structure
 Office for International Military Cooperation
 Audit Office
 Agency for Offices Administration

See also 

 Central Security Bureau of the Chinese Communist Party

References

Citations

Sources 

 
 

 
Institutions of the Central Committee of the Chinese Communist Party
Defence agencies of China
Government agencies of China
Military of the People's Republic of China
China